5SOS5 is the fifth studio album by Australian pop rock band 5 Seconds of Summer, released on 23 September 2022 through BMG Rights Management. It was preceded by the release of the singles "Complete Mess", "Take My Hand", "Me Myself & I", "Blender" and "Older" (featuring Sierra Deaton). The track list was revealed on 10 May 2022, while the album was announced alongside the release of "Me Myself & I" on 11 May 2022.

The band promoted the album whilst on the Take My Hand World Tour, which officially began in Vancouver on 11 June 2022 after the band's rescheduled tour dates ended on 21 May. "Easy for You to Say" and "Blender" were first performed live on the tour.

Background
5 Seconds of Summer spent two years working on the album, beginning after the release of Calm in 2020. Luke Hemmings called the lyrical content written for the album "extremely introspective". The band wrote and produced most of the album themselves, including the first two singles, "Complete Mess" and "Take My Hand".

Singles
The album's lead single, "Complete Mess", was released on 2 March 2022. It reached number 85 on the US Billboard Hot 100 in April 2022.

The second single, "Take My Hand", followed on 1 April 2022, and charted at number 72 on the Irish Singles Chart. 

Third single "Me Myself & I" was released alongside the album announcement on 11 May 2022. It peaked at number 90 on the ARIA Singles Chart.

The fourth single "Blender" was released with no prior announcement on 13 July 2022, after the band had begun performing it live on the Take My Hand tour.

The fifth single "Older" (featuring Sierra Deaton) was released on 7 September 2022, after the band released a snippet of Hemmings singing "Older" on their social media pages the previous day; however, it was not announced the song would be released the next day. A video of the song, featuring an end-of-the-world scenario, was released on 18 October 2022.

Critical reception

Matt Collar of AllMusic gave the album a 4 out of 5 stars and wrote that "much of the album brings to mind the Weeknd's distinctive brand of atmospheric pop -- songs shot through with a yearning, after-hours regret and spiritual modern-rock uplift". He praised the songs "Complete Mess", "Me Myself & I", "Take My Hand", and "Bad Omens". Clash called the album 5 Seconds of Summer's "most cohesive and impressive work to date". Cara-Louise Scott from The Indiependent praised it as "a beautifully hand-crafted album, symbolising eleven years of the band’s musical experience."

The album debuted at number two on the Billboard 200 with 48,000 equivalent album units sold in its first week in the US, including 36,000 in pure album sales. The album charted in the top 10 in an additional ten countries, including at number one in the UK and Australia.

Track listing

Notes

 "Complete Mess", "Carousel", "Haze", "Blender", and "Tears!" are stylized in all caps.

Personnel
5 Seconds of Summer
 Luke Hemmings – guitar, lead vocals (tracks 1–8, 10–16, 18), keyboards (tracks 1–6, 8, 10–13, 15–19), backing vocals (tracks 1–6, 8–15, 17–19), producer (track 8), instrumentation (tracks 5, 8), programmer (tracks 5, 8)
 Michael Clifford – guitar (tracks 1–2, 4–19), lead vocals (tracks 1–2, 10, 12–13, 15, 17–18), keyboards (tracks 1–6, 8, 10–13, 15–19), backing vocals (tracks 1–6, 8–19), producer (tracks 1–2, 5–8, 12–15, 17–18), instrumentation (tracks 1–2, 5–8, 12, 14–15, 17–18), programmer (tracks 1–2, 5–8, 12–15, 17–18), vocal producer (track 4)
 Calum Hood – bass guitar, lead vocals (tracks 1, 6, 8–10, 13, 15, 18), guitar (track 11), keyboards (all tracks), backing vocals (tracks 1–6, 8–19), producer (track 8), instrumentation (track 8), programmer (track 8)
 Ashton Irwin – drums, lead vocals (tracks 8–9, 11, 19), keyboards (tracks 1–6, 8–13, 15–19), backing vocals (tracks 1–6, 8–19), producer (track 8), instrumentation (track 8), programmer (track 8)

Additional musicians
 James Abrahart – background vocals (track 3)
 Colin "Doc" Brittain – keyboards (track 9)
 Sierra Deaton – lead vocals (track 7)
 Jason Evigan – guitar (track 3), synthesizer (tracks 3–4)
 Elijah Noll – backing vocals (track 19)
 Michael Pollack – keyboards (track 7)
 Jacob Scesney – saxophone (track 10)
 Sly – keyboards (track 16)
 Mark Schick – guitar (track 3)
 Peter Thomas – keyboards (track 10), background vocals (track 10)

Technical personnel

 Neal Avron – engineer (tracks 1, 5–6)
 Courtney Ballard – engineer (track 2)
 Jon Bellion – producer (track 4)
 Chris Bennion – assistant mix engineer (track 2)
 Michael Bono – engineer (track 11)
 Bryce Bordone – assistant mixer (tracks 4, 16)
 Colin "Doc" Brittain – producer (tracks 9, 19), instrumentation (tracks 9, 19), programmer (tracks 9, 19), vocal producer (tracks 9, 19)
 Zander Caruso – additional production (tracks 6–7), instrumentation (track 7), programmer (track 7), additional programmer (track 17), drum programmer (tracks 15, 17)
 Lionel Crasta – engineer (tracks 3–4), vocal producer (tracks 3–4)
 Tommy Dietrick – engineer
 Jason Evigan – producer (tracks 3–4), drum programmer (tracks 3–4), vocal producer (track 3)
 Rafael Fadul – engineer (tracks 3–4)
 John Feldmann – producer (tracks 11–12), instrumentation (track 11), programmer (track 11)
 Michael Freeman – engineer (tracks 8, 12, 15, 17, 19)
 Chris Gehringer – engineer (tracks 1–19)
 Serban Ghenea – engineer (tracks 4, 16)
 Eli Heisler – assistant mixer (track 7)
 Cameron Hogan – engineer (tracks 3–4)
 Wylie Hopkins – producer (track 13), instrumentation (track 13), programmer (track 13)
 Andy Inadomi – engineer (tracks 7, 15)
 Chris Kasych – engineer (tracks 2, 4–6, 8, 12–14)
 James Krausse – engineer (track 2)
 Rob Kinelski – engineer (track 7)
 Kevin McCombs – engineer (track 9, 19), additional production (tracks 9, 19)
 Dylan McLean – engineer (tracks 11–12)
 Jacob Munk – engineer (tracks 1–2, 6, 18–19)
 Pete Nappi – producer (track 4)
 Tim Nelson – additional production (track 1)
 Chris "Tek" O'Ryan – vocal producer (track 1)
 Matthew Pauling – producer (track 8), engineer (tracks 2–6, 8, 10, 15–16), instrumentation (track 8), programmer (track 8), vocal producer (track 6)
 Jackson Rau – engineer (tracks 3–4)
 Scott Skrzynski – assistant mixer (tracks 1, 5–6)
 Tyler Spry – additional production (tracks 2, 18)
 Sly – producer (track 16), engineer (track 16), instrumentation (track 16), programmer (track 16)
 Spike Stent – engineer (tracks 2–3, 9–11, 13–14, 18)
 Scott Stewart – engineer (tracks 11–12)
 Peter Thomas – producer (track 10), engineer (track 10), drum programmer (track 10)
 Josh Thornberry – engineer (tracks 11–12)
 Jake Torrey – additional production (track 10)
 Matt Wolach – assistant mixer (tracks 2–3, 9–11, 13–14, 18)
 Rami Yacoub – producer (track 16), engineer (track 16), instrumentation (track 16), programmer (track 16)

Charts

Weekly charts

Year-end charts

Release history

Notes

References

2022 albums
Albums produced by Jason Evigan
Albums produced by Jon Bellion
Albums produced by Colin Brittain
Albums produced by John Feldmann
BMG Rights Management albums
5 Seconds of Summer albums